Liaoxia Station is a metro station in Dongguan, China. It opened on 27 May 2016.

Station platform

References

Dongguan Rail Transit stations
Railway stations in China opened in 2016